Feyzabad (also Romanized as Feyẕābād and Faizābād; also known as Feiz Abad Khoosaf and Feyzābād-e Sarchāh) is a village in Qaleh Zari Rural District, Jolgeh-e Mazhan District, Khusf County, South Khorasan Province, Iran. At the 2006 census, its population was 171, in 59 families.

References 

Populated places in Khusf County